The 1931 Ole Miss Rebels football team was an American football team that represented the University of Mississippi as a member of the Southern Conference during the 1931 college football season. In their second season under head coach Ed Walker, Ole Miss compiled a 2–6–1 record.

Schedule

References

Ole Miss
Ole Miss Rebels football seasons
Ole Miss Rebels football